The Okabayashi space (or medial division of the pararectal space) is an anatomical potential space in the pelvis.

The ureter divides the pararectal space into the Okabayashi space medially and the Latzko space laterally.

Borders 

 Dorsal - Levator ani
 Superior - Uterine artery
 Superior / Ventral- Posterior leaf of the broad ligament
 Medial - Rectum
 Lateral - Ureter

Contents 

 Inferior hypogastric plexus - The parasympathetic nerve supply to the bladder

References

Pelvis